Sir Francis Carr Clerke, 7th Baronet (24 October 1748 – 15 October 1777) was a British Army officer who was killed at the Battles of Saratoga.

Life

Francis Carr Clerke was born in London, England on 24 October 1748. He was educated at the Abingdon School in Abingdon-on-Thames. On 12 February 1769, after his father Francis died, Clerke succeeded to his baronetcy. Beginning in August 1769, he studied belles-lettres at Göttingen University. After studying at the Inner Temple, Clerke enlisted in the British Army as a lieutenant in the 3rd Regiment of Foot Guards. During the American War of Independence, he served as an aide-de-camp to General John Burgoyne. Clerke was killed in action on 15 October 1777 during the Saratoga campaign, when he was reportedly shot by Timothy Murphy, a soldier in the Morgan's Riflemen unit.

See also
 List of Old Abingdonians

References

1748 births
1777 deaths
Baronets in the Baronetage of England
British Army personnel of the American Revolutionary War
British military personnel killed in the American Revolutionary War
People educated at Abingdon School
Scots Guards officers